Moravița may refer to:

 Moravița, a commune in Timiș County, Romania
 Moravița (Bârzava), a river in Romania and Serbia, tributary of the Bârzava 
 Moravița (upper Bârzava), a small river in Romania, tributary of the Bârzava